The Huron League is an MHSAA athletic conference located in southern Michigan.

Members

The following schools are currently members:

Membership timeline

See also
Michigan High School Athletic Association

References

Michigan high school sports conferences
High school sports conferences and leagues in the United States